Fatema Almahmeed (born 14 June 1999) is a Bahraini swimmer. She competed in the women's 50 metre freestyle event at the 2016 Summer Olympics. She finished in 74th place in the heats with a time of 32.28 and she did not advance to the semi-finals.

References

External links
 

1999 births
Living people
Bahraini female swimmers
Olympic swimmers of Bahrain
Swimmers at the 2016 Summer Olympics
Place of birth missing (living people)
Bahraini female freestyle swimmers